Bad Behaviour may refer to:

 Bad behaviour (mathematics), a pathological phenomenon; properties atypically bad or counterintuitive
 Bad Behavior, a 1988 short story collection by American writer Mary Gaitskill
 Bad Behaviour (1993 film), 1993 British comedy film
 Bad Behaviour (2010 film)
 Bad Behaviour (2023 film), 2023 New Zealand dark comedy film
 Bad Behaviour (TV series), 2023 Australian television drama series
 Bad Behaviour (song), by Jedward
 Bad Behaviour Tour, by Jedward
 Misbehaviour

See also
 Behavior (disambiguation)
 Bad (disambiguation)
 Behaving Badly (disambiguation)
 Good behaviour (disambiguation)